This is a list of the main association football rivalries in Israel.

City derbies
Tel Aviv derbies:
 Tel Aviv derby: Maccabi Tel Aviv vs. Hapoel Tel Aviv
 Tel Aviv mini-derby: Maccabi Tel Aviv or Hapoel Tel Aviv vs. Bnei Yehuda Tel Aviv
 Haifa derby: Maccabi Haifa vs. Hapoel Haifa
 Jerusalem derby: Beitar Jerusalem vs. Hapoel Jerusalem 
 Ramat Gan derby: Hapoel Ramat Gan vs. Hakoah Amidar Ramat Gan
 Petah Tikva derby: Maccabi Petah Tikva vs. Hapoel Petah Tikva
 Rehovot derby: Maccabi Sha'arayim vs. Hapoel Marmorek
 Ashdod derby: Hapoel Ashdod vs. Maccabi Ironi Ashdod

Regional derbies
 Sharon derbies: 
Maccabi Netanya vs. Hapoel Kfar Saba. 
Hapoel Ra'anana vs. Hapoel Kfar Saba
Hapoel Herzliya vs. Hapoel Ra'anana
Ramat HaSharon vs. Maccabi Herzliya

Inter-regional rivalries
 Political rivalry: Hapoel Tel Aviv vs. Beitar Jerusalem
 Religious/ethnic rivalry: Beitar Jerusalem vs. Bnei Sakhnin
 Jerusalem vs Tel Aviv rivalry: Beitar Jerusalem vs. Maccabi Tel Aviv
 Jerusalem vs Haifa rivalry: Beitar Jerusalem vs. Maccabi Haifa
 Tel Aviv vs Haifa rivalry: Hapoel Tel Aviv or Maccabi Tel Aviv vs. Maccabi Haifa or Hapoel Haifa

References

Football in Israel